AP-41 or Ap-41 may refer to :
 Ap-41 process, an obsolete colour reversal process used generally until 1983 for photographic films such as Agfa CT18
 Autopista AP-41, a proposed highway in central Spain
 USS Stratford (AP-41), a World War II U.S. Navy Stratford-class transport